Cupar is a town and former royal burgh in Fife, Scotland.

Cupar may also refer to:

 Places or things near or in the above town in Fife, Scotland
 Cupar Muir, a small settlement in Fife situated beside the town of Cupar
 Cupar railway station
 Cupar Castle, a former royal castle at Cupar, Fife, Scotland
 Cupar Hearts A.F.C.
 HMS Cupar (1918), a Hunt-class minesweeper of the Royal Navy from World War I
 Cupar, Saskatchewan, a town in Saskatchewan province, Canada
 Rural Municipality of Cupar No. 218, a rural municipality in Saskatchewan, Canada